Medeleni may refer to:

 Medeleni, a village in Vultureni Commune, Bacău County, Romania
 Medeleni, a village in Golăiești Commune, Iaşi County, Romania
 Medeleni, a village in Petreşti Commune, Ungheni district, Moldova
 La Medeleni, a book by Romanian novelist Ionel Teodoreanu